The 2016 African Rally Championship was the 36th season of the African Rally Championship (ARC), the FIA regional zone rally championship for the African continent. The season began on February 11 in the Côte d'Ivoire, and ended on November 13 in Madagascar, after seven events.

For the second year running a Kenyan driver claimed the title. Mitsubishi Lancer driver Don Smith won the title in dominant fashion, taking victory in Tanzania and finishing second in five other rallies, wrapping up the title early, leading to no African Championship competitors entering the series finale in Madagascar. Star of the championship was Zambian driver Muna Singh Jr., winning in South Africa, Zambia and Rwanda. Singh was unable to finish any other rally and was overcome by Smith's consistency. Fellow Zambian driver Ismail Shermohamed was third in the title, taking victory in Uganda.

Event calendar and results

The 2016 African Rally Championship was as follows:

Championship standings
The 2016 African Rally Championship points are as follows:

References

External links

African Rally Championship
African
Rally Championship